Athole Dane Shearer Hawks (November 20, 1900 – March 17, 1985) was a Canadian-American actress and socialite, who was the sister of motion picture star Norma Shearer and MGM film sound engineer Douglas Shearer.

Early life 
Athole Dane Shearer was born in 1900 in Montreal, Quebec. Her parents divorced when she was a teenager, her brother Douglas remained with their father Andrew in Canada, and she and her sister Norma moved to New York City with their mother Edith. The latter hoped to get her daughters into show business.

Film career 
In 1920, the sisters appeared as extras and in bit parts in productions filmed in New York, New Jersey, and Florida, but Edith moved with them to California with the intention of securing contracts with one of the studios in Hollywood.

Shearer's appearances in productions in the eastern United States consisted of only small uncredited roles in three films, the first being as a schoolgirl in The Flapper, a silent comedy released by Selznick Pictures Corporation. In California, Athole's acting career essentially ended, never achieving the success experienced by Norma at Metro-Goldwyn-Mayer.

Bipolar disorder 
A contributing factor to Shearer's limited work in motion pictures was her persistent medical issues, most notably her long struggle with bipolar disorder, a disorder most likely that her father also had. Her condition and personal problems associated with the illness proved to be detrimental to her film career. Ultimately, Shearer was required to spend many years in mental institutions until her disorder was diagnosed.

Personal life 
In 1923, Shearer married John Ward, with whom she had a son, Peter. The couple divorced in 1928; and on May 30 that year she married again, then to film director Howard Hawks, with whom she had two more children: David, born in 1929, and Barbara, born in 1935. She and Hawks divorced in 1940, reportedly due to Hawks' affair with New York and Hollywood socialite Nancy "Slim" Gross, whom he later married.

Death 
 
Shearer died in 1985 in Los Angeles, and she was interred in the Forest Lawn Memorial Park Cemetery in Glendale, California.

Filmography 
 The Flapper (1920)
 Way Down East (1920)
 The Restless Sex (1920)

See also 

 Other Canadian pioneers in early Hollywood

References 
Notes

Citations

External links 
 
 

1900 births
1985 deaths
Canadian film actresses
Canadian silent film actresses
Canadian socialites
American socialites
Actresses from Montreal
People from Westmount, Quebec
People with bipolar disorder
Burials at Forest Lawn Memorial Park (Glendale)
Anglophone Quebec people
20th-century Canadian actresses
Canadian emigrants to the United States